The United Electoral Front of Workers, Farmers and Refugees was a political party in Greece.

History
The party first contested national elections in 1926, when they won ten seats in the parliamentary elections, becoming the fifth-largest faction in the Hellenic Parliament. Despite their success in 1926, the party did not contest the 1928 elections, subsequently disappearing.

Election results

Hellenic Parliament

References

Defunct political parties in Greece
Communist Party of Greece
Defunct left-wing political party alliances
Defunct political party alliances in Greece
Defunct socialist parties in Greece
History of Greece (1924–1941)
United fronts